Lisa Lucas is senior vice president at Knopf Doubleday, and a former executive director of the National Book Foundation.

Early life
Lucas was born in New York City and grew up in Teaneck, New Jersey and Montclair, New Jersey. Lucas's father is musician Reggie Lucas, a Grammy-winning songwriter and producer.

Lucas attended the University of Chicago, where she studied English. She graduated in 2001.

Career
Lucas began her career as a 15-year-old intern at Vibe magazine; at 17 she worked for radio station KIIS-FM. After college, Lucas worked for Chicago's Steppenwolf Theater, then the Tribeca Film Festival. In 2012, Lucas became publisher of arts magazine Guernica.

Reporting on Lucas's 2016 appointment to executive director of the National Book Foundation, NBC said: "With Lucas at the forefront of the National Book Foundation and Awards, the future of publishing looks very bright." The Los Angeles Times said Lucas "is clearly poised to bring the organization to a new level...ideally suited" to promote the foundation. She is the third director in the history of the foundation, "one of America’s key literary institutions," and the first woman and the first African-American to lead the organization. As executive director, she has publicly discussed the importance of inclusivity in publishing and reaching young readers.

In July 2020, Lucas was named by Knopf Doubleday as a senior vice president who will oversee both Pantheon Books and Schocken Books.

References

Living people
American publishers (people)
People from Montclair, New Jersey

People from Teaneck, New Jersey
University of Chicago alumni
Year of birth missing (living people)